12:51 is the first official single by pop-acoustic duo Krissy & Ericka, taken from their second studio album Twelve: Fifty One (2012).

Background and composition
Krissy originally wrote the song. She wrote the entire song over the course of three weeks only working between 12:51:00 and 12:51:59, hence the title. It took her two years to finish the song. She also said that the background behind the song was about moving on.

Music video
The artists first created a premiere of the music video through YouTube. The music video of the song was first uploaded on January 30, 2012 on their YouTube account, and was first premiered on MYX as a television preview.

Live performance
In a video in YouTube, Krissy and Ericka perform 12:51 at Music Comes Alive, Venice Piazza at McKinley Hills. Krissy & Ericka also performed in David Choi's live tour in Manila, Philippines as an opening act for the show.

Chart performance
The song charted in the Philippine Charts and debuted at 6.

References

2011 songs
2012 singles
MCA Records singles